The 2002 WNBA season was the fifth season for the Detroit Shock. The team went 0–13 in their first thirteen games, finishing with a franchise worst 9–23.

Offseason

WNBA Draft

Regular season

Season standings

Season schedule

Player stats

References

Detroit Shock seasons
Detroit
Detroit Shock